"I Love the Motherland‘s Blue Skies" is a song sung by members of the People's Liberation Army Air Force of China. It was used to encourage members of the air force to fight for the homeland. It was written by the composer Yang Ming (羊鸣) and the lyrics were written by Yan Su.

Lyrics

Use 
This song was used on the 60th anniversary of the founding of The People's Republic of China.

References 

Year of song missing
Chinese patriotic songs
People's Liberation Army Air Force
Songs about the military